Pompano Beach High School (formerly Pompano High School, Pompano Beach Senior High School and The Pompano Beach High School Institute of International Studies) is a college-preparatory school located in Pompano Beach, Florida, which instructs grades 9 through 12. Founded in 1928, it is the second oldest high school in the Broward School District.

Pompano Beach High received an FCAT school grade of "A" for the 2013–14 academic year. The school has maintained an "A" ranking for 11 of the 12 years since the score-based system began during the 2001–02 academic school year. Pompano Beach High School has been rated 260th best high school in the country and the 9th best in the State of Florida. Since 1958, the school's sports teams have been named the Golden Tornadoes. According to the 2014 edition of U.S. News & World Report, Pompano Beach High School has been ranked the 19th Best High School in the State of Florida.

Academics and ranking 
Pompano Beach High School is one of the highest achieving schools in Broward County. The school has been awarded the Blue Ribbon School of Excellence status, which is considered the highest honor an American school can achieve and is shared by only 3.9% of schools nationwide and is also an Apple Distinguished School for its use of innovative technology and project-based learning to educated students. Both of these awards were accomplished under the guidance of principal Dave Gordon, who retired in 2010.

In 2006, Governor Jeb Bush recognized Pompano Beach High School as one of the top fifty schools in the state of Florida. Pompano ranked 13th out of nearly 1,100 high schools in the state and was recognized as the highest ranked fully comprehensive high school in Broward County. Pompano Beach High School also ranked 6th in the state for the greatest gains in student achievement for its lowest quartile of students.

Pompano Beach High School has earned an "A" rating 11 times based on FCAT scores since 2002.

In 2014, Pompano Beach High School was ranked one of the Best High Schools in the nation by U.S. News & World Report, earning the Gold Medal Status. It is listed as the 19th Best High School in the State of Florida and as the 251st Best High School in the United States.

History

Early years (1928–1985) 

Pompano High School was founded in 1928, in Pompano Beach, Florida, to address the growing need for secondary education in northeastern Broward County. The first class to graduate from Pompano High was the class of 1928, which had only twelve students. 

The school's sports teams were called the Beanpickers after the part-time job that many of the school's students had in the formerly agricultural area of the time. The Beanpicker was also the name of the school's yearbook, which was first published in 1943.

In 1947, following the merger of the towns of Pompano and Pompano Beach, the school changed its name to Pompano Beach High School. In 1957, construction began on NE 6th Street to create a new campus to facilitate the growing community.  In 1958, the student body changed the name of the school's sport teams from the Beanpickers to the Golden Tornadoes. In 1960, a new football field, gymnasium, theater, classrooms and new offices were built. The school moved to its present location on March 14, 1960 and was at last developing with a full range of offered courses, sports, civic organizations and clubs.

In the 1980s, however, changing population trends and westward migration led to lower attendance rates, and in 1985, Pompano Beach High School closed for 12 years amid much political controversy and community protest. Its campus was then temporarily used as a center for adult education and community programs.

Modern era (1997–present) 

In 1997, the school was resurrected as a satellite campus of Blanche Ely High School called the Pompano Beach High School Institute for International Studies. Later, it once again became a school in its own right. Almost always known simply as Pompano Beach High School, it was Broward County's first all-magnet school, specializing in "International Affairs with Informational Technology." Located on the 1960 campus, the school grew to fill the buildings it had once occupied, with the exception of several buildings that had come to be used in the intervening years by the City of Pompano Beach and by the Broward County School District. In 2001, the first class graduated from Pompano since the school's closure in 1985. 

In February 2004, the school's name was shortened to Pompano Beach High School. On April 13, 2004, a newly built campus opened adjacent to the older campus. On this new campus, the school's current cafeteria, library, offices, and classrooms are contained in a single three-story building. The new facility boasts a totally wireless environment with high-speed connectivity, a 3:1 student to computer ratio and a network with multiple servers. The school transformed their classrooms into 21st century digital models to include interactive "smart" boards, ceiling-mounted LCD projectors, and sound and voice amplification systems to help teachers meet student needs. A new auditorium was completed in 2005, which the school uses for concerts, plays and special guest presentations. The two original gyms are still in use and have been renovated. The buildings that had been used by the school since its 1997 reopening were demolished to make room for the school's parking lot.

Despite having been closed for 12 years in recent history, the school maintains some connections with its long past. Volume 64 of the Beanpicker was published in 2007; the volume numbers for the years 1985–97 were skipped. Alumni from the school's earlier days continue to meet for reunions.

Athletics 
 During the spring 2004 Season, the Girls' Track and Field team won the Class 2A State Championship and placed 5th nationally at the Nike Indoor Championships in the 4 x 200 Meter Relay with individual first place wins in the 60 metres hurdles event.

 Baseball
 Basketball (boys and girls)
 Cheerleading
 Cross country running
 Flag football
 Football
 Golf (boys and girls)
 Lacrosse (boys and girls
 Soccer (boys and girls)
 Softball
 Swimming
 Tennis (boys and girls)
 Track and field
 Volleyball
 Water Polo)

Demographics 
As of the 2021-22 school year, the total student enrollment was 1,226. The ethnic makeup of the school was 64.7% White, 22.4% Black, 26.5% Hispanic, 7.2% Asian, 4.5% Multiracial, 1% Native American or Native Alaskan, and 0.2% Native Hawaiian or Pacific Islander.

Notable alumni 
 Charlene Honeywell, United States District Judge on the United States District Court for the Middle District of Florida
 Quintin Jones, former Professional Football Player for the Houston Oilers.
 Barry Krauss, Professional Football Player for the Baltimore/Indianapolis Colts and Miami Dolphins.
 Pam Kruse, former World Record Holder in the 400 Meter Freestyle and 1968 Olympics Silver Medalist in the 800 Meter Freestyle.
 Myron Lewis, NFL cornerback for the Tampa Bay Buccaneers
 John Nelson, 1968 Olympic Gold Medalist in the 4×200 Meter Freestyle Relay and 1964 Summer Olympics Silver Medalist in the 1500 Meter Freestyle.
 Dan Nugent, former NFL player for the Washington Redskins

References

External links 
 Pompano Beach High School official web site

Broward County Public Schools
High schools in Broward County, Florida
Public high schools in Florida
Magnet schools in Florida
Buildings and structures in Pompano Beach, Florida
1928 establishments in Florida
Educational institutions established in 1928